This is a listing of the horses that finished in either first, second, or third place and the number of starters in the Hutcheson Stakes, an American Grade 2 race for three-year-olds at 7 furlongs on dirt held at Gulfstream Park in
Hallandale Beach, Florida.  (List 1973-present)

References

External links
The Hutcheson Stakes at Pedigree Query

Gulfstream Park
Lists of horse racing results